Diachromus germanus is a species of ground beetle and the only species of the monotypic genus Diachromus.

It is native to Europe and the Near East. In Europe, it is found in Albania, Austria, Belarus, Belgium, Bosnia and Herzegovina, Bulgaria, Corsica, Crete, Croatia, the Czech Republic, mainland Denmark, mainland France, Germany, Great Britain including the Isle of Man, mainland Greece, Hungary, mainland Italy, Kaliningrad, Latvia, Liechtenstein, Luxembourg, Moldova, North Macedonia, Poland, mainland Portugal, Romania, central and southern Russia, Sardinia, Sicily, Slovakia, Slovenia, mainland Spain, Switzerland, the Netherlands, Ukraine and Yugoslavia.

References

External links

Harpalinae
Beetles described in 1758
Taxa named by Carl Linnaeus